Hutton Sessay is a village and civil parish in the Hambleton district of North Yorkshire, England. In 2013 the population of the civil parish was estimated at 100.  The village is situated just west of the A19 between Thirsk and Easingwold.

History

Though the village is not mentioned specifically in the Domesday Book, it is thought that some of the lands would have been split between the manors of Sessay and Birdforth and followed the inheritance of those places thereafter.
By the end of the 19th century, the village lands were owned by Viscount Downe.

The village used to have both Wesleyan and Primitive Methodist Chapels.

Governance

The village is within the Thirsk and Malton UK Parliament constituency. It lies within the Topcliffe ward of Hambleton District Council and Sowerby electoral division of North Yorkshire County Council.

Geography

The nearest settlements are Sessay  to the south-west, Birdforth  to the south-east and Thirkleby  to the north.

The 1881 UK Census recorded the population as 131. There is a public house and a caravan park in the village.

References

External links

Villages in North Yorkshire
Civil parishes in North Yorkshire